Charles was an Irish priest in the early fourteenth century: the first recorded Archdeacon of Kilfenora.

References

14th-century Irish Roman Catholic priests
Archdeacons of Kilfenora